Twelve Thousand Head of Cattle (Romanian: Douăsprezece mii de capete de vite) is a 1952 novella by the Romanian writer Mircea Eliade. It was written in Paris in December 1952 and published in 1963 in Nuvele, printed by Cercul de Studii "Destin" of Madrid. It was  translated by Eric Tappe in Fantastic Tales, London, Dillon’s, 1969.

The subject of this novella is a strange time travel of a cattle dealer on a street in Bucharest during the Second World War. After a civil defense siren announces the imminence of an air raid, Iancu Gore is hiding in an anti-aircraft shelter. Also in the shelter are three other people. Later Iancu Gore learns that they died more than a month ago. His disturbing experience is not believed by anyone.

See also
Mircea Eliade bibliography

References

1952 short stories
Romanian short stories
Fantasy short stories
Romanian novellas
Bucharest in fiction
World War II short stories
Works by Mircea Eliade
Short fiction about time travel